Cobitis vardarensis, the Vardar spined loach, is a species of ray-finned fish in the true loach family Cobitidae.

Environment
Cobitis vardarensis is recorded to be found in a freshwater environment within a demersal depth range. This species lives in brackish waters. It is also native to a subtropical climate.

Size
Cobitis vardarensis can reach the maximum length of about 11 centimeters or about 4.33 inches as an unsexed male.

Distribution
Cobitis vardarensis is recorded to be found in Europe, the Aegean Sea basin, Pinios to Gallikos drainages, Greece, and North Macedonia, and named for the Vardar river.

Biology
Its status is insufficiently known. Cobitis vardarens is found in still waters of lakes, oxbows, and backwaters on mud to silt bottoms that are rarely in moving or flowing water. This species is also known to occur in marshlands, lowland rivers with little current, springs and associated wetlands. During its period of breeding, this species is recorded to have distinct pairing.

Population
The population of this species is known to be very abundant. This species is recorded to be of least concern for becoming an endangered species.

Threats
Cobitis vardarensis is threatened by water abstraction and pollution.

Classification
The taxonomic classification of Cobitis vardarensis is as follows:
Kingdom : Animalia
Phylum : Chordata
Subphylum : Vertebrata
Superclass : Gnathostomata
Class : Actinopterygii
Order : Cypriniformes
Family : Cobitidae
Genus : Cobitis
Species : Cobitis vardarensis

References

Cobitis
Freshwater fish of Europe
Fish described in 1928
Taxa named by Stanko Karaman
Taxonomy articles created by Polbot